Charles Ross (10 May 1863 – 5 February 1935) was an Australian cricketer. He played 15 first-class cricket matches for Victoria between 1886 and 1901.

See also
 List of Victoria first-class cricketers

References

External links
 

1863 births
1935 deaths
Australian cricketers
Victoria cricketers
Cricketers from Melbourne